A Trinity house, also known as a Father, Son & Holy Ghost house, is a small townhouse, principally found in Philadelphia, Pennsylvania. Trinity houses are characterized by small size, with three or four floors vertically stacked, each usually consisting of one principal room, many of which were built in the 18th and 19th centuries. They are joined by small, winding stairways, and have few or no interior doors. The "Trinity" name is derived from three floors, three rooms. Kitchens are usually in the basement, with very low headroom. The selection of furnishings for such houses is strictly limited by the difficulty of moving furniture between floors.

Trinity houses were typically located on alleys behind main streets, to be found in Philadelphia's deep blocks. A notable concentration of trinity houses is on Elfreth's Alley, a National Historic Landmark district. Due to their size and the inconvenience of their arrangements and their survival in affluent neighborhoods, trinity houses are often far more affordable than other houses in the same neighborhood. The houses have enjoyed a revival in interest as a by-product of the tiny-house movement.

References

External links
 Trinity Houses at Atlas Obscura

Houses in Philadelphia
House types